Yuan Jiahua (January 19034 September 1980) was a Chinese linguist and dialectologist from Zhangjiagang, Jiangsu province. He graduated from the English Department of Peking University in 1932, worked as an editor in the North Shanghai New Books Office and as a teaching assistant at Peking University. In 1937, he went to Oxford University to major in Old English and Germanic languages. After returning to China, he held professorships in Kunming and Beijing. He has made significant contributions to the field of linguistics primarily in researching the languages of China's ethnic minorities and Chinese dialects.

References

1903 births
1980 deaths
Dialectologists
Linguists from China
Scientists from Suzhou
Peking University alumni
Alumni of the University of Oxford
20th-century linguists